Corella is a village (frazione) of the comune of Dicomano, Metropolitan City of Florence, central Italy. The village is located in a valley of the Apennines, about 50 km from Florence.

Andrea del Castagno lived in Corella during the war between Florence and Milan and returned to his home after the end of that war.

Corella has a church built in 1184.

Frazioni of the Province of Florence